Sir David Dale, 1st Baronet (11 December 1829 – 28 April 1906), was an English industrialist. He died as chairman of the Consett Iron Company and the mining firm Pease & Partners, and as a director of the North Eastern Railway Company. Dale owes his main distinction to his pioneer application of the principle of arbitration to industrial disputes.

Life
He was born at Murshidabad, Bengal. He was the younger son of David Dale, an employee of the East India Company and judge of the city court there, and his wife, Ann Elizabeth, daughter of the Revd George Douglas of Aberdeen. Dale's great-uncle was David Dale, the Glasgow banker and philanthropist, whose daughter married the socialist Robert Owen and was mother of Robert Dale Owen. His elder brother, James Douglas (1820–1865), joined the Indian army on the Madras establishment, and became lieutenant-colonel. Dale's father died on board the Providence on 23 June 1830, during the voyage home with his wife and children. Mrs Dale, while travelling with her children to New Lanark to visit her family, was detained at Darlington by an accident to the mail coach, and whilst staying at a hotel, befriended members of the Quaker Backhouse family. She became a member of the Society of Friends in 1841, and died in 1879.

Dale was educated privately at Edinburgh, Durham, and Stockton. Brought up among Quakers, Dale remained a member of the Society of Friends until the late 1880s.

Dale's adult career began in the office of the Stockton and Darlington Railway Company, and in 1852, at the age of twenty-three, he was appointed secretary to the Middlesbrough and Guisborough section of the line. On 27 January 1853 he married a widow, Annie Backhouse Whitwell, née Robson (d. 1886), who already had two children; another son and daughter were born to them.

In 1858 Dale entered into partnership with William Bouch and became lessee of the Shildon locomotive works; the partnership ended in the early 1870s. Henceforth his activities rapidly expanded. He was concerned with the formation of the Consett Iron Company, of which he was appointed inspector in 1858, subsequently becoming managing director in 1869 and chairman in 1884. In 1866 he embarked on extensive shipbuilding enterprises in co-operation with the firms of Richardson, Denton, and Duck of Stockton, Denton and Grey of Hartlepool, and Thomas Richardson & Sons of Hartlepool, who combined together with a view to amalgamation. Dale became vice-chairman of this ambitious undertaking, but the union was not successful, and the companies reverted shortly afterwards to their former independent positions. Dale retained an interest in the two first-named concerns. He was also managing partner of Pease & Partners Ltd, and chairman of companies working iron ore mines near Bilbao in Spain. In 1881 he became a director of the North Eastern Railway Company, having previously served as director of the Stockton and Darlington Railway, and on the formation of the Sunderland Iron Ore Company in 1902 he was appointed chairman. He was an active member of the Durham Coal Owners' Association and of the Cleveland Mine Owners' Association.

Dale owes his main distinction to his pioneer application of the principle of arbitration to industrial disputes. The first board of arbitration was formed in connection with the iron trade of the north of England in March 1869, and Dale was its first president. The experiment was successful, serving to stabilise the industry's previously disorganised and volatile industrial relations. In recognition of Dale's services to the Iron Trades Conciliation Board he was publicly presented in 1881 with an address and a portrait painted by Walter William Ouless. Dale's important position within industry led to his appointment on several royal commissions, among which were those on trade depression (1885–86); on mining royalties (1889–93); and on labour (1891–94). At the Berlin labour conference of 1890, convened by the German emperor, he was one of the representatives of Great Britain, and during the sittings he received marked attention from the emperor and Bismarck. He helped to found the Iron and Steel Institute in 1869, and acted as honorary treasurer from that date until 1895, when he was elected president.

In politics Dale was a Liberal, though his attention to business interests prevented him from standing for parliament. He became High Sheriff of Durham in 1888, and the University of Durham made him an honorary DCL in 1895. He was created a baronet in the same year.

His first wife having died in 1886, on 2 August 1888 he married Alice Frederica Milbank, elder daughter of Sir Frederick Milbank, of Barningham Hall, Yorkshire. Lady Dale died at Eastbourne on 25 November 1902.

Active to the end, Dale died at York on 28 April 1906, and was buried in his home town of Darlington. In his honour a Sir David Dale chair of economics was instituted in 1909 at Armstrong College, Newcastle upon Tyne, then part of Durham University. A memorial lectureship on labour problems was also initiated at Darlington, the first lecture being delivered by Sir Edward Grey on 28 October 1910.

References

Sources

People of the Industrial Revolution
People from Darlington
English Quakers
Baronets in the Baronetage of the United Kingdom
People from Murshidabad district
High Sheriffs of Durham
1829 births
1906 deaths
Burials in County Durham
British industrialists